Kill zone is the primary target area for a military ambush.

Kill zone may also refer to:

 The blast radius for an explosive weapon such as a grenade or bomb
 The hollow bull's eye of a field target

Film and television
 "Kill Zone" (CSI episode), an episode of the American television series CSI: Miami
 "The Kill Zone", an episode of the American television series The Unit
 Kill Zone (film), a 1993 film directed by Cirio H. Santiago
 Kill Zone, the U.S. title of the Hong Kong film SPL: Sha Po Lang
 "Kill Zone", a third-season episode of MacGyver

Other uses
 Kill Zone, a novel by Jack Coughlin and Donald A. Davis
 Killzone (series), a series of first-person shooter video games
 Killzone (video game), the first game in the series
Kill Zone (album), a 2012 album by American rapper Philthy Rich

See also
The Killing Zone, a 1985 unauthorised James Bond novel
Killing Zone, 1996 video game for PlayStation